 

This list of most-liked YouTube videos contains the top 30 videos with the most likes of all time, taken directly from the video page. YouTube implemented a like and dislike button on these pages in March 2010, part of a major redesign of the site. This served as a replacement for their five-star rating system; YouTube's designers found the previous system ineffective because the options to rate a video between two and four stars were rarely selected.

The music video for LMFAO's song "Party Rock Anthem" stood as the most-liked video on YouTube in 2012, with 1.56 million likes, until the video for Psy's "Gangnam Style" surpassed it in September that year with more than 1.57 million likes. Following this accomplishment, "Gangnam Style" entered the Guinness World Records book as the most-liked video on YouTube and on the Internet as of 2012. Psy's video remained the most-liked on YouTube for nearly four years until August 27, 2016, when Wiz Khalifa's "See You Again" featuring Charlie Puth surpassed it with 11.21 million likes. Less than a year later, on July 25, 2017, Luis Fonsi's "Despacito" featuring Daddy Yankee claimed the top spot with 16.01 million likes. Despacito became the first YouTube video to reach 50 million likes on 23 October 2022.

Dednahype holds the record for the most liked non-music video, "OMG Best Teacher," at 34 million likes. "OMG Best Teacher" is also the most-liked video uploaded under the YouTube Shorts banner.



Top videos
The following table lists the top 30 most-liked videos on YouTube, with each total rounded to the nearest ten thousand likes, uploader, and upload date.

Historical most-liked videos
The following table lists the videos that became YouTube's most-liked video, from the implementation of the like button in March 2010 to the present.

Timeline of most-liked videos (Mar 2010 – Jan 2021)

See also

 List of most-disliked YouTube videos
 List of most-viewed YouTube videos
 List of most-viewed online videos in the first 24 hours
 List of most-viewed online trailers in the first 24 hours
 List of most-subscribed YouTube channels
 List of most-viewed YouTube channels

Notes

References

Most Liked
YouTube Most Liked Videos
Youtube videos